Lindston Loch (NS 37272 16195) was a small freshwater loch situated within a glacial 'kettle hole.' The loch lies in the South Ayrshire Council Area, Parish of Dalrymple, Scotland.

The loch

In the 1870s the OS map shows that the loch was circa 200 yards (180 metres) long by 100 yards (90 metres) wide, roughly oval in shape, and of an extent of 1.125ha or 2.78 acres however a section to the south-west had been infilled, possibly with quarrying waste from the nearby abandoned quarries. The loch was fed by burns running down from near Boghall and Balsarroch.

Drainage
The loch's drainage may have begun in the 18th century when Alexander Montgomerie, 10th Earl of Eglinton, was pursuing a number of agricultural improvements on his extensive estates and other landowners followed his example. Some drainage work may have taken place in the 1740s because of the improvements undertaken to provide employment for Irish estate workers during the Irish potato famines of the 1740s and the mid 19th centuries. Many drainage schemes also date to the end of World War I when many soldiers returned en masse to civilian life.

Uses
An outflow once ran down towards Dustyhall and joined the Purclewan Burn that powered the mill at Burnton. It is recorded that drainage works were carried out in 1790.

Curling matches are recorded at the loch on 15 January 1850 and on 19 December 1844. A curling pond was still recorded in the late 1890s.

Archaeology

In 1790 Smith records that a bronze tripod ewer was found in Lindston Loch, measuring  inches high, by  inches across the mouth, spreading out to  inches. It has a spout and handle and is regarded being of late medieval origin; for many years it was kept at the Dalrymple Manse. A bronze tripod ewer, with spout and handle, almost identical to the Lindston Loch specimen, was found at nearby Skeldon. The old Roman road from the Solway Firth and the Clyde ran near here, passing from Causeway Farm onto Perclewan and Lindston. The above mentioned ewer was found near this road; a glazed pitcher of earthenware was found at Perclewan near the old road in 1833, bearing the figure of a man's face and hands on the front.

Lindston Camp sat above the loch, on the nearly level summit of a broad ridge 400 feet above the sea. A circular wet ditch, 21 feet wide and 2 or 3 deep to the surface of the weedy water, encloses a space 130 feet in diameter, scarcely rising above the surface of the surrounding field, and has no trace of a rampart. The earthwork remains may possibly been a henge commanding magnificent views in all directions. The entrance has been in the east where a causeway (7 m broad) crosses the ditch.

Etymology
The meaning of Lindston may derive from Lind, the Scots for a lime (Tilia species) or linden tree. It was also used in the general sense of woodland. The overall sense being that of a 'rocky outcrop within woodland'.

Natural history
The loch in 1846 was well stocked with pike, perch, and eels, and was frequented by wild-duck, teal, widgeon, and other aquatic fowl. An extensive woodland extends towards Lindston Farm and large areas of reeds (Phragmites species) are present. The loch site recorded as a wildlife site within South Ayrshire. The OS maps of the 1870s show a plantation beneath Lindston Farm and extensive areas of willow scrub have developed.

Nelly Kilpatrick

When Robert Burns was 15 he met his first young love, Nelly Bone, better known as Nelly Kilpatrick in this part of Ayrshire. Nelly was the daughter of the Purclewan hamlet miller and they met when William Burns hired some extra help to bring in the harvest while they were at nearby Mount Oliphant Farm. It was with Nelly in mind that he wrote his first song "Handsome Nell" –

Some years later Burns wrote of this song, saying –

"I never had the least thought or inclination of turning poet till I got once heartily in love, and then rhyme and song were, in a manner, the spontaneous language of my heart. I remember I composed it in a wild enthusiasm of passion, and to this hour I never recollect it but my heart melts, and my blood sallies at the remembrance."

See also
 Loch Fergus
 Martnaham Loch
 Snipe Loch
 Carcluie Loch

References

Notes

Sources

 Archaeological & Historical Collections relating to the counties of Ayrshire & Wigtown. V. IV. Edinburgh : Ayr Wig Arch Soc. 1884.
 MacIntosh, Donald (2006). Travels in Galloway. Glasgow : Neil Wilson. .
 Paterson, James (1863–66). History of the Counties of Ayr and Wigton. II. – Kyle. Edinburgh: J. Stillie.
 Smith, John (1895). Prehistoric Man in Ayrshire''. London : Elliot Stock.

External links

Lochs of South Ayrshire
History of South Ayrshire
Former lochs
Robert Burns
Freshwater lochs of Scotland
Lakes of South Ayrshire